The 2016 New York State Assembly elections were held on Tuesday, November 8, 2016, with the primary election on September 13, 2016. Voters in the 150 districts of the New York State Assembly elected their representatives. The elections coincided with the elections for other offices, including for U.S. President and the state senate.

Overview

Results

District 1

District 2

District 3

District 4

District 5

District 6

District 7

District 8

District 9

District 10

Notes

References

Assembly
New York State Assembly elections
New York Assembly